Slate, Wyn and Me is a 1987 Australian film directed by Don McLennan and starring Sigrid Thornton, Simon Burke, and Martin Sacks.,

Premise
A small town school teacher witnesses the murder of a policeman by a criminal, Wyn, and is kidnapped by him and his brother, Slate.

Cast
Sigrid Thornton as Blanche McBride
Simon Burke as Wyn Jackson
Martin Sacks as Slate Jackson
Tommy Lewis as Morgan
Lesley Baker as Molly
Harold Baigent as Sammy
Michelle Torres as Daphne
Murray Fahey as Martin
Taya Straton as Pippa
Julia MacDougall as Del Downer
Peter Cummins as Old Man Downer
Reg Gorman as Wilkinson
Warren Owens as Tommy
Eric McPhan as Policeman
Simon Westaway as Policeman
Kurt Von Schneider as Truck Driver

References

External links

Slate, Wyn & Me at Oz Movies

1987 films
Australian crime drama films
1980s English-language films
Films directed by Don McLennan
Australian action drama films
1980s Australian films